John Nada Saya (8 August 1978 – December 2011) is a Tanzanian long-distance runner. He was born in Arusha. He finished fifteenth in the short race at the 2000 World Cross Country Championships. He competed in the marathon race at the 2004 Summer Olympics, but did not finish. He also won the 2001 Milan Marathon, setting a personal best of 2:08:57 hours.

Achievements
All results regarding marathon, unless stated otherwise

Personal bests
Half Marathon - 1:01:19 hrs (2000)
Marathon - 2:08:57 hrs (2001)

External links

marathoninfo
John Nada Saya's profile at Sports Reference.com

1978 births
2011 deaths
Tanzanian male marathon runners
Athletes (track and field) at the 2004 Summer Olympics
Olympic athletes of Tanzania
Tanzanian male long-distance runners